, also known as Love and Fortune, is a Japanese manga series written and illustrated by Akira Nitta. It was serialized in Kodansha's seinen manga magazine Monthly Morning Two from December 2015 to April 2019, with its chapters collected in seven tankōbon volumes. A twelve-episode television drama adaptation was broadcast on TV Tokyo from July to October 2018.

Characters

 /

Media

Manga
Kodansha collected its chapters in seven tankōbon volumes, released from July 22, 2016, to June 21, 2019.

Volume list

Drama
In June 2018, it was announced that the series would receive a television drama adaptation. The series was broadcast for twelve episodes on TV Tokyo from July 27 to October 12, 2018. The series was also streamed on Netflix.

See also
Asobiai—another manga series by the same author.

Notes

References

Further reading

External links
 
 

Kodansha manga
Romance anime and manga
Seinen manga
TV Tokyo original programming